The Stephen Foster Stakes is a Grade I American Thoroughbred horse race for horses aged three and older  over a distance of  miles on the dirt run annually in mid-June at Churchill Downs Spring Meet in Louisville, Kentucky. The race is named in honor of famed composer Stephen Foster, who wrote numerous melodies including "My Old Kentucky Home" which is the song that is annually played as the Kentucky Derby field parades on the track.

History
The Stephen Foster Handicap was inaugurated on 19 June 1982 as the Stephen Foster Handicap and has progressed from Grade III status in 1988 to Grade II in 1995 to Grade I in 2002. In 2019, it was downgraded to Grade II. In December 2022, it was announced that the race would return to Grade I status for the 2023 season.
Currently offering a purse of $500,000, the race draws some of the top older horses from various parts of the United States. Since 2015 the event is a Breeders' Cup Challenge "Win and You're In" event, offering the winner an automatic berth in the Breeders' Cup Classic.

The race was restricted to horses four years of age an older in 1983 and from 1985 through 1987. 

The 2006 edition of the Stephen Foster Handicap produced its biggest upset ever when jockey Calvin Borel aboard 91-1 longshot Seek Gold defeated the favored 2003 winner, Perfect Drift.

Four horses used victories in the Stephen Foster as part of their resumes in Horse of the Year campaigns. The four are Black Tie Affair (1991), Saint Liam (2005), Curlin (2008), and Gun Runner (2017).  Five horses have won the Stephen Foster and the Breeders' Cup Classic in the same year.  Black Tie Affair (1991),  Awesome Again (1998) and Blame (2010) won both races at Churchill Downs. Saint Liam (2005) won his running of the Classic at Belmont Park. Gun Runner (2017) won the Classic at Del Mar. Curlin (2008) carried the highest impost of any Stephen Foster winner: 128 pounds.  Colonial Colony (2004) carried the lightest winning Foster impost at 111 pounds.

Records
Speed record
  1:47.28 - Victory Gallop (1999)

Margins
 7 lengths - Gun Runner (2017)

Most wins
 2 - Vodika Collins (1982, 1983)
 2 - Recoup the Cash  (1994, 1995)

Most wins by a jockey
 3 - Robby Albarado (2007, 2008, 2009)
 3 - Pat Day (1985, 1998, 2003)

Most wins by a trainer
 2 - Forrest Kaelin (1982, 1983)
 2 - Jere Smith, Jr. (1994, 1995)
 2 - Patrick B. Byrne (1997, 1998)
 2 - Mark Casse (2011, 2015)

Most wins by an owner
 2 - Milbert B. Collins (1982, 1983)
 2 - Richard E. Trebat (1994, 1995)
 2 - Stronach Stables (1998, 2000)
 2 - West Point Thoroughbreds (2007, 2009)

Winners

See also
 Stephen Foster Handicap "top three finishers" and starters
 List of attractions and events in the Louisville metropolitan area
 List of graded stakes at Churchill Downs
 List of American and Canadian Graded races

External links
 Ten Things You Should Know about the Stephen Foster Handicap at Hello Race Fans!

References

Grade 2 stakes races in the United States
Graded stakes races in the United States
Recurring sporting events established in 1982
Churchill Downs horse races
Breeders' Cup Challenge series
1982 establishments in Kentucky